Gose is a surname. Notable people with the surname include:

 Anthony Gose (born 1990), American baseball player
 Isabel Marie Gose (born 2002), German swimmer
 Stephen M. Gose, American oilman and polo player

See also
 Gore (surname)

English-language surnames